Orbiter 9 is a 2017 science fiction romantic drama directed by Hatem Khraiche in his directorial debut. It stars Clara Lago and Álex González. The film premiered in Spain on April 7, 2017.

Plot
Helena is a striking woman in her 20s who has lived her whole life on the Orbiter 9 spaceship. Her parents had told her, by archived video, their intent to commit suicide so that Helena could survive, due to an urgent depletion of oxygen. The orbiter's computer, Rebecca, cared for her. With oxygen levels low, another spaceship docks with hers and a maintenance engineer named Alex boards for repairs. She later enters his sleeping quarters, convincing him to make love to her as it may be her only opportunity ever. When he returns to his ship, Alex rides an elevator and emerges... on Earth, in the middle of a wooded, guarded research compound. He drives to the main building and reports to scientist Hugo, head of one of four international sites secretly experimenting on humans in the interest of an eventual mission to reach Celeste, a habitable planet orbiting in Alpha Centauri, since Earth's oceans are poisoned and otherwise spoiled for future generations. Hugo reports to Katherine, the worldwide Program Director.

Alex has been depressed since a spaceship he helped design to reach Celeste exploded with a full test crew on board. Hugo reminds him that departure is 20 years away, and accidents are inevitable. Alex regularly visits Silvia, a therapist, and finally tells her about his feelings for Helena. Alex returns to a startled Helena in his normal Earth clothes and reveals the truth of her situation. He uses video and bio-feeds from recorded records so no one at mission control will know she is gone, and smuggles her to his apartment. Alex exposes her to the world, even going to a bar with his friends, including Xiao, a doctor. When Helena develops a rash on her shoulder, Alex takes her to Xiao. Xiao is suspicious of how her skin appears to have never been exposed to sunlight, but promises to get back to them with his test results. While Alex is away, Helena explores the apartment. She has been given access to a hidden room with computer screens showing there are 10 identical Orbiter simulators under Hugo's management.

Finding the address in the Orbital dossiers, she hunts down her parents, who are married program scientists unrelated to her. They explain that the 10 subjects are clones of people dead for two generations and were all deceived in the same way. The 'father' handcuffs her to a railing so he can call Hugo, but the 'mother' knocks him out and lets Helena escape. Helena returns to Alex, angry with him, but trusts his apologies. Alex reaches out to Silvia for help; she offers to hide them in an apartment she owns in a sprawling slum. Hugo, leading the manhunt, searches Alex's apartment and finds Silvia's contact data. While Alex and Helena pick up the key from Silvia, Hugo and his vicious guards arrive. Hugo, suspecting the couple is hiding there, shoots Silvia in the head, causing Helena to cry out while hidden. The two flee over the rooftops. Helena injures her leg and later insists Alex jump across a rooftop, to show her how it is done, but she does not follow and is captured. Alex is able to escape. Katherine effectively orders Hugo to terminate Helena, no good for further research and a living liability to the company.

Alex hears from Xiao, who updates him on Helena's medical condition. Alex rushes to the Control Center and is shot and captured attempting to reach Hugo. Alex informs Hugo of the news he learned from Xiao; Helena is six weeks pregnant. Hugo and Katherine agree that the Project can gain valuable insights by observing a real birth and subsequent growth of a family group inside Orbiter 9. Helena tells Hugo she has one condition if she and Alex are to return to Orbiter 9. Some years later, a young woman exits Orbiter 9 in the forest and is greeted by a satisfied but aged Hugo. She looks up at the sky as the first spaceships lift off for Celeste (offscreen). An unrevealed figure steps out behind the young woman as she smiles.

Cast

Reception
On review aggregator Rotten Tomatoes, the film holds an approval rating of 67% based on 6 reviews, with an average rating of 5.5/10.

Awards and nominations
 Brussels International Fantastic Film Festival (Best European Film) — nominated 
 Santa Barbara International Film Festival (Nueva Vision Award) — nominated

See also 
 List of Spanish films of 2017
 Ascension (miniseries)

References

External links

 RodDoor Replica Courtesy of Klemens Torggler (http://www.torggler.co.at/)

Spanish science fiction films
Colombian science fiction films
Colombian drama films
Spanish drama films
2017 directorial debut films
Films scored by Federico Jusid
Films set on spacecraft
2010s Spanish-language films
2010s Spanish films
2010s Colombian films